Citharichthys stigmaeus, the speckled sanddab, is a species of flounder in the genus Citharichthys. It is native to the eastern Pacific Ocean, ranging from Alaska in the north to Baja California, Mexico in the south.

It is a dull brown or tan colour, with a white or pale brown underside. Males are often mottled with orange spots.

While Citharichthys stigmaeus is technically a game fish, it is of little commercial importance due to its diminutive size, and the larger Pacific sanddab is readily available. The species has a high rate of reproduction, and coupled with the minimal threat from fishing means that it is abundant along the entire North American coast.

Citharichthys stigmaeus eats small crustaceans and its predators are fish, birds and marine mammals. The fish can camouflage itself by adapting to look like the surface it is on.

References

Citharichthys
Western North American coastal fauna
Fauna of the San Francisco Bay Area
Fish described in 1882
Taxa named by David Starr Jordan